Operation Abstention was a code name given to a British invasion of the Italian island of Kastelorizo (Castellorizo) off the Turkish Aegean coast, during the Second World War, in late February 1941. The goal was to establish a motor torpedo-boat base to challenge Italian naval and air supremacy on the Greek Dodecanese islands. The British landings were challenged by Italian land, air and naval forces, which forced the British troops to re-embark amidst some confusion and led to recriminations between the British commanders for underestimating the Italians.

Background
After the attack on Taranto and the success of Operation Compass, an offensive in Cyrenaica, Libya from December 1940 – February 1941, the British conducted operations to neutralize Italian forces in the Dodecanese islands. The operation was intended as a first step towards the control of the Aegean Sea. Despite isolation, Italian naval and air forces in the area were still capable of carrying out hit-and-run attacks on Allied shipping between Egypt and Greece.

Battle

24 February

The British planned to land a force of about 200 men of No. 50 Commando, assisted by a 24-man detachment of Royal Marines to establish a beachhead on the island, to be followed 24-hours later by an army unit to consolidate the British position.

25 February

Before dawn, fifty of the commandos landed from ten whaleboats on Nifti Point, south of the settlement, while the Royal Marines occupied the harbour. The landings were supported by the submarine , which had previously made a reconnaissance of the landing points and acted as a beacon for the incoming ships. The Italian garrison on Kastelorizo consisted of 35 soldiers and agents of the Guardia di Finanza in charge of a wireless station. The commandos ambushed an Italian patrol on the truck between Nifti Point and the port, killing two soldiers and wounding one. The British surprised the garrison, seized the radio outpost and inflicted 13 casualties, including twelve prisoners, the rest of the commandos coming ashore during the action. Before being overrun, the Italians had managed to send a message to Rhodes, the main Italian air and naval base in the Dodecanese.  (Vice Admiral) Luigi Biancheri, commander of the Italian naval forces in the Aegean Sea reacted swiftly. From 08:00 and 09:30, aircraft of the Regia Aeronautica (Italian Royal Air Force) raided the harbour castle and the main hills of the island, where the commandos were dug in. Ladybird was struck by a bomb and three sailors were wounded. Short of fuel, Ladybird re-embarked the Royal Marines and made for Haifa, which cut the radio link of the commandos with Alexandria. After communications breakdowns and other mishaps, the follow-up force from Cyprus was diverted to Alexandria.

26 February

The Regia Marina (Royal Italian Navy) counter-attack began after sunset on 26 February, when the torpedo boats  and  landed about 240 soldiers north of the port and used their  guns to bombard British positions at the docks and the Governor's palace, killing three and wounding seven commandos. The Italian warships evacuated a number of Italian civilians who had gathered at harbour after learning of their presence in the port.

27 February
Biancheri, with Lupo, Lince, MAS 546 and MAS 561, landed troops on the morning of 27 February, the operation having been delayed by high seas. Italian forces already ashore harassed the exhausted and isolated British commandos, who were equipped only for a 24-hour operation. The destroyers  and  arrived later in the day with more ground forces; a total of 258 troops and 80 marines were eventually disembarked by Italian ships. As the Italians attacked, the commandos retreated to their encampment at the landing beach near Nifti point, under fire from Lupo. One company remained in the area of the local cemetery. The commander ordered the warships to disrupt the Italian landings but the destroyers did not find the Italian ships. Hereward reported that the Italian surface action threatened the landing of the main British force embarked on Rosaura, which had already been compromised by the air attacks on the harbour. The ships were ordered to Alexandria to reorganise; Admiral Renouf fell ill and was replaced by Captain Egerton, commander of Bonaventure, which complicated matters.

28 February
More British forces from Alexandria arrived in the early hours of 28 February. A platoon of the Sherwood Foresters found the landing point abandoned by the commandos; along with scattered equipment and ammunition were a dead soldier and two stragglers, who told them of the Italian counter-attack. Major Cooper of the Sherwood Foresters, who had sailed back to Decoy, concluded, after talks with the other commanders, that lack of naval and air support made withdrawal inevitable. The bulk of the landing party, isolated on a small plateau in the east end of Kastelorizo, was re-embarked by 03:00. Italian troops surrounded and eventually captured a number of commandos who had been left behind. While covering the withdrawal,  was attacked by Crispi, which had fired twenty shells on British positions at Nifti Point, steaming from the south. The Italian destroyer fired two torpedoes which missed and Jaguar replied with her  main armament. Jaguar received a 40 mm hit on her searchlight that made its gunfire ineffective and the British force sailed back to Alexandria. The destroyers ,  and Jaguar made a sweep between Rhodes and Kastelorizo after a radar contact and detecting wireless traffic in the area but failed to intercept the Italian warships as they returned to base.

Aftermath

Analysis

Cunningham described the operation as "a rotten business and reflected little credit to everyone" and laid blame on Renouf. A Board of Inquiry found that Herewards commander made a misjudgement by rejoining Decoy, instead of engaging the Italian force without delay, which caused the failure of the main landing and the isolation of the commandos. British commanders had also been surprised by the Italian riposte, especially the frequent air attacks which were unopposed. Greene and Massignani, writing in 1998, noted the British capture of Y-I, an Italian cipher book. In 2009, Vincent O'Hara wrote that the operation showed that the Italians dominated the seas around even their outlying bases and that this was not to be the last time that the British underestimated them. The Italians retained control of the Dodecanese Islands until the armistice of September 1943. When Italy changed sides, British forces landed on the islands to support the Italian garrisons in the Dodecanese Campaign (8 September – 22 November 1943). British and Italian troops were attacked and defeated by a German operation and the islands came under German control until the end of the war.

Casualties
In 1998, Greene and Massignani wrote that the British suffered three men killed, eleven wounded and 27 missing for an Italian loss of eight men killed, eleven wounded and ten missing.

Order of battle

Regia Marina

 Admiral Luigi Biancheri
 destroyers: Crispi, Sella 
 torpedo boats: , 
 MAS motor launches: MAS-541, MAS-546
 Original garrison: 30 soldiers of the signal corps10 carabinieri and Guardia di Finanza (custom agents)
 Landing force: 240 infantry, 88 marines

Royal Navy

 Admiral Andrew Cunningham
 Suda Force:
 destroyers: HMS Hereward, HMS Decoy
 gunboat:  HMS Ladybird
 submarine: HMS Parthian
 Commando force: 200 soldiers
 Marine detachment: 24 marines
 Cyprus Force
 3rd Cruiser Squadron: HMAS Perth, HMS Bonaventure
 Armed yacht: HMS Rosaura
 Garrison Force:  soldiers
 Alexandria Force:
 destroyers: HMS Jaguar, HMS Hero

See also

 Convention between Italy and Turkey, 1932
 Balkans Campaign
 Dodecanese Campaign
 Operation Mandibles

Footnotes

References

Books

Websites

Further reading

External links
 British Aegean Campaign, 1943

Conflicts in 1941
1941 in Greece
World War II British Commando raids
Battles of World War II involving Italy
Land battles of World War II involving the United Kingdom
Naval battles of World War II involving Italy
Naval battles and operations of World War II involving the United Kingdom
Naval battles of World War II involving Australia
Italian naval victories in the battle of the Mediterranean
Kastellorizo
Dodecanese under Italian rule
World War II invasions
World War II campaigns of the Mediterranean Theatre
Amphibious operations of World War II
February 1941 events
Amphibious operations involving the United Kingdom
Amphibious operations involving Italy
Invasions by the United Kingdom